"Somewhere in the World" is the debut single by series two winner of The X Factor Australia, Altiyan Childs. Serving as the lead single from his self-titled debut album, "Somewhere in the World" was released for digital download following his win on The X Factor on 22 November 2010. The song debuted on the ARIA Singles Chart at number eight, with sales of 15,706 units in its first week of release. In New Zealand, "Somewhere in the World" reached number five on the singles chart.

Background and release
"Somewhere in the World" was written by Andrew Dorff, Busbee and Klaus Derendorf, who also produced the track. The four finalists of the second series of The X Factor Australia, which included including Childs, Mahogany, Sally Chatfield and Andrew Lawson, recorded the song in preparation for a single release as soon as the winner was announced. After Childs was announced the winner of the series, "Somewhere in the World" was given to him as his debut single and released digitally on 22 November 2010. It impacted Australian mainstream radio stations the following day and became the third most added song to radio in its second week of release.

Chart performance and promotion
"Somewhere in the World" debuted at number eight on the ARIA Singles Chart, with first-week sales of 15,706 units. In New Zealand, the song debuted at number five on the singles chart, before dropping four places down to number nine the following week. In 2014, "Somewhere in the World" was certified platinum by the Australian Recording Industry Association (ARIA), for sales exceeding 70,000 copies.

The music video was filmed in two days in King Street, Newtown in November 2010, and premiered online on 3 December 2010. Childs performed "Somewhere in the World" on Sunrise on 9 December 2010.

Track listing
Digital download
 "Somewhere in the World" – 3:59

Personnel
Vocals – Altiyan Childs
Songwriting – Andrew Dorff, Busbee, Klaus Derendorf
Production – Klaus Derendorf
Engineering – Braddon Williams
Mastering –  Tom Coyne

Source:

Charts

Weekly charts

Year-end charts

Certifications

Release history

See also
List of top 10 singles in 2010 (Australia)

References

2010 songs
2010 debut singles
Altiyan Childs songs
Songs written by Andrew Dorff
Songs written by busbee
Songs written by Klaus Derendorf
Sony Music Australia singles
2010 singles